Gaius Veturius Cicurinus was a Roman consul in 455 BC with Titus Romilius Rocus Vaticanus. His term saw continued divisions between the plebeians and the patricians. His father was named Publius Veturius Cicurinus, possibly identifying him with the consul of 499 BC.

Biography

Consulship
In 455 BC, he was elected consul with Titus Romilius Rocus Vaticanus. They issued orders during a period of high tension between the patricians and the plebeians. The tribunes of the plebs, representatives of the people, demanded in vain for many years that the power of the consuls be limited in written law. The Lex Terentilia, first drafted in 462 BC, was deferred each year by the tribunes who proposed numerous identical drafts of the law.

Proceedings
In the wake of their decision, Veturius and Romilius were taken to court by the plebeian aedile Lucius Alienus and by the tribune of the plebs, Gaius Calvus Cicero, in early 454 BC. The testimony of Lucius Siccius Dentatus implicated Titus Romilius, but Siccius retracted his testimony when the old consul offered to send an ambassador to the Greek cities as a sign of appeasement during political tensions. Nevertheless, Romilius and Veturius were found guilty and ordered to pay a considerable indemnity of 10,000 asses. This proved impracticable, and so a law was passed allowing the indemnity to be satisfied by an equivalent value in cattle and bronze.

Augur 
In 453 BC Veturius was elected as augur to replace Gaius Horatius Pulvillus who had died in a large pestilence that ravaged Rome.

References

Works cited
 
 

5th-century BC Roman consuls